Beaune is a commune in France.

Beaune may also refer to:

People
Renaud de Beaune (1527–1606), French Catholic ecclesiastic
Florimond de Beaune (1601–1652), French jurist and mathematician
Michel Beaune (1933–1990), French actor
Colette Beaune (born 1943), French historian
Christine Pires-Beaune (born 1964), French politician
Clément Beaune (born 1981), French politician
Hallie Beaune, author

Places
Arrondissement of Beaune
Canton of Beaune
Beaune, a tributary of the Loing

Wines
Beaune wine
Burgundy wine

Other uses
Beaune FC

See also